Goitre Halt railway station was a station in Llanmerewig, Powys, Wales. The station was opened on 9 July 1923 and closed on 9 February 1931. The halt was on the east side of the line, consisting of a short platform constructed from stone, backfilled with earth and cinders. There was also a siding here which connected to the branch to the south of the halt and terminated at the rear of the platform thus giving very little space for passengers. There are no remains of the halt today.

References

Further reading

Disused railway stations in Powys
Railway stations in Great Britain opened in 1923
Railway stations in Great Britain closed in 1931
Former Great Western Railway stations
1923 establishments in Wales